Declieuxia is a genus of flowering plants in the family Rubiaceae. The genus is found in tropical America.

Species

Declieuxia aspalathoides Müll.Arg.
Declieuxia cacuminis Müll.Arg.
Declieuxia coerulea Gardner
Declieuxia cordigera Mart. ex Zucc.
Declieuxia dasyphylla K.Schum. ex Steyerm.
Declieuxia decumbens J.H.Kirkbr.
Declieuxia deltoidea Müll.Arg.
Declieuxia diamantinae J.H.Kirkbr.
Declieuxia diantheroides Standl.
Declieuxia dusenii Standl.
Declieuxia fruticosa (Willd. ex Roem. & Schult.) Kuntze
Declieuxia gracilis J.H.Kirkbr.
Declieuxia hatschbachii J.H.Kirkbr.
Declieuxia humilis (Müll.Arg.) J.H.Kirkbr.
Declieuxia irwinii J.H.Kirkbr.
Declieuxia juniperina A.St.-Hil.
Declieuxia lancifolia J.H.Kirkbr.
Declieuxia leiophylla Müll.Arg.
Declieuxia lysimachioides Zucc.
Declieuxia marioides Mart. ex Zucc.
Declieuxia muscosa A.St.-Hil.
Declieuxia oenanthoides Mart. ex Zucc.
Declieuxia passerina Mart. ex Zucc.
Declieuxia pruinosa Pohl ex DC.
Declieuxia rhexioides Mart. ex Zucc.
Declieuxia saturejoides Mart. ex Zucc.
Declieuxia spergulifolia Mart. ex Zucc.
Declieuxia tenuiflora (Willd. ex Roem. & Schult.) Steyerm. & J.H.Kirkbr.
Declieuxia verticillata Müll.Arg.

References

External links
Declieuxia in the World Checklist of Rubiaceae

Rubiaceae genera
Coussareeae